Unknown Sender is a 1950 West German comedy film directed by Ákos Ráthonyi and starring Henny Porten, Bruni Löbel and Cornell Borchers. It was shot at the Wandsbek Studios in Hamburg. The film's sets were designed by the art director Mathias Matthies.

Cast
 Henny Porten as Direktorin
 Bruni Löbel as Magda Lehmann
 Cornell Borchers as Dr. Elisabeth Markert
 Käthe Haack as Frau Lehmann
 Ursula Herking as Frau Bock
 Marina Ried as Adele
 Hans Richter as Dr. Alfred Braun
 Volker von Collande as Fredy Brown
 Paul Kemp as Schuldiener Bock
 Hubert von Meyerinck as Schmoll, Lehrer
 Rudolf Platte as Lehrer Zirbel
 Albert Florath as Professor Wagner
 Willy Maertens as Herr Lehmann
 Friedl Rostock as Dora
 Ingeborg Körner as Brigitte
 Ann Höling as Edith
 Ilse Zielstorff as Rosemarie
 Katharina von Miculicz-Radesci as Eva
 Petra Unkel as Wilma
 Ilse Gottburg as Claire
 Gustl Busch as Stine
 Änne Bruck as Frau Riedel
 Tilla Hohmann as Bianca Voss
 Elly Burgmer as Frau Braun
 Felicitas Deutsch as Sekretärin
 Wolf Martini as Empfangschef
 Waldemar Radick as Hotelportier
 Aranka Jaenke as Blumenverkäuferin
 Gabriele Donner as Verkäuferin
 Willi Wagner as Verkäufer
 Marga Maasberg as Frau Kroll

See also
 Magda Expelled (1938)
 Maddalena, Zero for Conduct (1940)

References

Bibliography
 Parish, Robert. Film Actors Guide. Scarecrow Press, 1977.

External links
 

1950 films
1950 comedy films
German comedy films
West German films
Films directed by Ákos Ráthonyi
1950s German-language films
Remakes of Hungarian films
Real Film films
Films shot at Wandsbek Studios
German black-and-white films
1950s German films